A death hoax is a deliberate  report of someone's death that is later proven to be untrue. In some cases it might be because the person has intentionally faked death.

Celebrities

In the 21st century, death hoaxes about celebrities have been widely perpetuated via the Internet. However, they are not a new phenomenon: in 1945 following the death of Franklin Roosevelt, there were hoax reports of the deaths of Charlie Chaplin and Frank Sinatra, among other celebrities of the time. Possibly the most famous hoax of this type was the "Paul (McCartney) is dead" rumor of the late 1960s.

Hoaxes about the death of a celebrity increase in frequency when genuine celebrity deaths occur, such as after the deaths of Ed McMahon, Farrah Fawcett, Billy Mays and Patrick Swayze. Paul Walker's death in December 2013 sparked rumors of Eddie Murphy dying in a snowboarding accident.

Other cases of celebrity death hoaxes fueled by social media include Bill Murray, Jon Bon Jovi, Gordon Lightfoot, Shahrukh Khan Jerry Springer, Bill Nye, BHMNL star Syuusuke Saito, Joe Rogan, Queen Elizabeth II, William H. Macy, Harry Belafonte, and Jimmy Fallon.

In October 2022, Michael J. Fox was targeted due to his Parkinson's disease and being middle-aged.

Politicians
On 8 January 1992, Headline News almost became the victim of a death hoax. A man phoned HLN and claiming to be President George H. W. Bush's physician claimed Bush died following an incident he had in Tokyo; however, before anchorman Don Harrison was about to report the news, executive producer Roger Bahre, who was off-camera, immediately yelled "No! Stop!" It was discovered that a CNN employee entered the information into a centralized computer, used by both CNN and Headline News teleprompters, and nearly got out on the air before it could be verified. The perpetrator of this hoax was identified as James Edward Smith from Idaho, who was questioned by the Secret Service and subsequently sent to a medical facility for psychiatric evaluation.

On 18 March 2015, a fake website reported the death of Lee Kuan Yew, first prime minister of Singapore. Lee was still alive at the time, but died on 23 March 2015. On 8 April 2015, a student who created the fake site was issued a warning by the Attorney-General of Singapore, after "careful consideration of all relevant factors".

Death denial rumors

An opposite phenomenon is death denial rumors: claims that a person is alive, despite official announcements of death (i.e. death certificates, confirmations, etc.). Notable cases are Elvis Presley, Andy Kaufman, Tupac Shakur, Prince, Michael Jackson and XXXTentacion.

See also
List of premature obituaries
Avril Lavigne replacement conspiracy theory

References